Copelatus cooperae is a species of diving beetle. It is part of the genus Copelatus of the subfamily Copelatinae in the family Dytiscidae. It was described by Bilardo & Pederzani in 1972.

References

cooperae
Beetles described in 1972